Katherine Ho is a singer known for her performance of Coldplay's Yellow in Mandarin Chinese for the 2018 film, Crazy Rich Asians. The song has reached No. 1 on Spotify Viral 50 Global chart. Previously, she appeared in a triple montage on season 10 of The Voice.

Early life 
Ho was born on July 13, 1999. At age 5, she started taking piano lessons. At age 9, she started singing.

Education 
In 2015, Ho attended Grammy Camp. In 2015, 2016 and 2017, she attended A Cappella Academy. Katherine graduated from Westlake High School, Thousand Oaks, California in 2017. 
As of 2018, Ho attended the University of Southern California in Los Angeles.  She is majoring in biology with a minor in songwriting.

Career 
In September 2014, Ho performed at the 626 Night Market in Santa Anita Racetrack venue in Arcadia, California. 
 In 2017 and 2018, she hosted and performed at Luna New Year Celebration at Santa Monica Place. 
Although still a college student, she became notable for recording the song Coldplay's Yellow in Mandarin, as one of the songs on the soundtrack of the 2018 film Crazy Rich Asians.

On August 30, 2019, Ho released her debut single Bellyaches.

References

External links
 The Voice - Season 10 contestants
 Profile of Katherine Ho - Yahoo.com
 Crazy Rich Asians Soundtrack - Yellow - Katherine Ho (Coldplay Cover)

1999 births
People from Thousand Oaks, California
The Voice (franchise) contestants
21st-century American women singers
American women pop singers
American musicians of Chinese descent
Living people
21st-century American singers